Dairy is a significant part of the overall agricultural production of the state of Ohio. The state ranks 11th in milk production in the United States. In 2018, the roughly 2,000 dairy farms with 263,000 cows produced more than 5.59 billion pounds, or 650 million gallons, of milk.

History
The first dairy cows came to what is now Ohio in the mid to late 18th century. Native Americans managed small cattle herds, which they acquired by trade or gift from Fort Detroit and by raiding frontier settlements in what is now Pennsylvania and Virginia.

Present day
The increasing growth of large, industrial dairy farms combined with low milk prices has led to the loss of many of Ohio's small family dairies.

Ohio lost nearly a quarter of its dairy farms from January 2017 to January 2019. The state went from 2,647 dairy farms to 2,045.

References

External links

 Ohio Department of Agriculture, Dairy Division

Milk
Economy of Ohio
Agriculture in Ohio
Dairy farming in the United States